The 2018 Mountain Pacific Sports Federation Volleyball Tournament was a postseason men's volleyball tournament for the Mountain Pacific Sports Federation during the 2018 NCAA Division I & II men's volleyball season. It was held from April 14 through April 21, 2018 at campus sites. The winner received The Federation's automatic bid to the 2018 NCAA Volleyball Tournament.

Seeds
All seven teams were eligible for the postseason, with the #1 seed receiving a bye to the semifinals and home court hosting rights for the semifinals and championship. Teams were seeded by record within the conference, with a tiebreaker system to seed teams with identical conference records. The #1 seed played the lowest remaining seed in the semifinals.

Schedule and results

Bracket

References

2018 Mountain Pacific Sports Federation volleyball season
2018 NCAA Division I & II men's volleyball season
Mountain Pacific Sports Federation Volleyball Tournament